Julie Hanan Carruthers (born January 30, 1960 in Sarasota, Florida. ) is an American soap opera producer and writer.

Positions held
All My Children
Executive Producer (October 27, 2003 - September 23, 2011)

General Hospital
Senior Supervising Producer (June 1997 - December 1999)
Supervising Producer (February 1996 - June 1997)
Producer (February 1994 - February 1996)

Port Charles
Executive Producer (December 27, 1999 - October 3, 2003)
Senior Supervising Producer (June 1, 1997 - December 24, 1999)

Santa Barbara
Producer (1986-1990)
Editor (1984-1986)
Associate Director (1984-1986)
Production Assistant (1984)

Awards and nominations
Hanan Carruthers has been nominated for several Daytime Emmy Awards.

Nominated
2003: Outstanding Drama Series: Port Charles
2005: Outstanding Drama Series: All My Children
2009: Outstanding Drama Series: All My Children
2010: Outstanding Drama Series: All My Children 
2012: Outstanding Drama Series: All My Children

External links
 ABC-TV: All My Children

Living people
American soap opera writers
Soap opera producers
People from Sarasota, Florida
1960 births
Screenwriters from Florida